Edvardas Mikučiauskas (23 August 1901 –  21 February 1986) was a Lithuanian footballer who competed in the 1924 Summer Olympics, the 0-9 defeat against Switzerland was his only international match he played.

References

1901 births
1986 deaths
Lithuanian footballers
Lithuania international footballers
Footballers at the 1924 Summer Olympics
Olympic footballers of Lithuania
Association football midfielders